Abai is a Murutic language of Borneo spoken in by the Abai people in the villages of Sembuak and Tubu.  Ethnologue mistakenly classifies it as a dialect of Putoh.

References

Murutic languages
Languages of Malaysia